Eric Michael Rains (born 23 August 1973) is an American mathematician specializing in coding theory and special functions, especially applications from and to noncommutative algebraic geometry.

Biography  
Eric Rains was 14 when he began classes in 1987. He left Case Western Reserve University with bachelor's degrees in computer science and physics and a master's degree in mathematics at age 17.

By means of a Churchill Scholarship he studied mathematics and physics at the University of Cambridge for the academic year 1991–1992, receiving a Certificate of Advanced Study in Mathematics. He received his PhD in 1995 from Harvard University with thesis Topics in Probability on Compact Lie Groups under the supervision of Persi Diaconis. From 1995 to 1996, Rains worked  at the IDA's Center for Communications Research (CCR) in Princeton. From 1996 to 2002 he was a researcher for AT&T Labs. From 2002 to 2003 he returned to the CCR in Princeton. In 2003, Rains became a full professor at the University of California, Davis and since 2007 has been a full professor at Caltech where he currently works. He has served as the Executive Officer of the Caltech Mathematics Department from 2019 to 2022. 

In the fall of 2006 he was a visiting professor at the University of Melbourne. He is the co-author with Gabriele Nebe and Neil J. A. Sloane of the 2006 book Self-Dual Codes and Invariant Theory.

In 2007, Rains was a plenary speaker at the Western Sectional meeting of the American Mathematical Society (AMS). In 2010 he was an invited speaker at the International Congress of Mathematicians in Hyderabad. He was elected a Fellow of the AMS in the class of 2018 for "contributions to coding theory, the theory of random matrices, the study of special functions, non-commutative geometry and number theory".

Selected publications

 (This article has over 1200 citations.)

References

1973 births
Living people
20th-century American mathematicians
21st-century American mathematicians
Case Western Reserve University alumni
Alumni of the University of Cambridge
Harvard University alumni
AT&T people
Fellows of the American Mathematical Society
Combinatorialists
Mathematical analysts
Probability theorists